Železničarski košarkarski klub Ljubljana, also known as Železničar Ljubljana, was a basketball team based in Ljubljana, Slovenia. The team competed in the Yugoslav First Federal Basketball League from 1949 until 1960. They also won the Yugoslav Cup in 1959.

Rosters 
1959 Yugoslav Cup
Čretnik, Kumer, Potočnik, Jože Zupančič, Škerjanc, Elselt, Senčar, Zajc, Urbanija, Vranič, Perhaj
Head coach: Kruno Brumen

Honours 
Slovenian Championship
Winners: 1948

Yugoslav Cup
Winners: 1959

References

Basketball teams established in 1943
Basketball teams in Slovenia
Sports clubs in Ljubljana
Basketball teams in Yugoslavia
1943 establishments in Yugoslavia